Dr. Freddy Elbaiady, MP 

Freddy Safwat Naguib Elbaiady (Egyptian Arabic: فريدي البياضي, elected member of the Egyptian Parliament (House of Representatives) (2021-2026).  Former member of the Shura Council, the Upper House of the Egyptian parliament,appointed in 2012, resigned June 29, 2013.
Born January 1, 1971 in Cairo, Egypt to an Egyptian family. He is married to Marian Nabil and has two sons, Rany Freddy Safwat Naguib Elbaiady and Nayer Freddy Safwat Naguib Elbaiady.

Education
Elbaiady studied medicine at Cairo University School of Medicine, specializing in radiology. He had professional training at Queen Elizabeth Hospital Birmingham in England, and in Hoorn, the Netherlands.

He has been working as a radiology consultant and is a member of the Radiological Society of North America, the British Institute of Radiology, and a fellow of the Egyptian Board of Radiology. Dr. Elbaiady is the founder and CEO of Salam Medical Center

Political Career

In 2011 Elbaiady was nominated by Elwafd political party to be the first name on the electoral list for the parliament elections, but he declined the nomination. Elbaiady mentioned at that time that he doesn't want to be committed to any political party.

In January 2011, he actively supported 2011 Egyptian revolution against Hosni Mubarak regime.
In July 2011, Elbaiady was appointed by the Deputy Prime Minister Yehia Elgamal to participate in the National Consensus, a conference that considered principles for a new constitution and monitored the interim period.

In December 2012, Dr. Elbaiady was appointed by Egyptian president Mohamed Morsi to the  Shura Council, the upper house of the Egyptian parliament. Elbaiady serves as an independent parliament member, joining the Human Rights Committee and the Constitutional Committee

Early in his political life, Elbaiady joined the former National Democratic Party (NDP) in his home city El-Qanatir Elkhaireya. NDP was the most powerful party and almost the only active party before the revolution. Elbaiady was mainly concerned with the community social services through the party, especially the health care issues. He rejected several nominations by the NDP at that time for parliamentary elections. Though the party was dissolved after the revolution, he was one of few party members who kept a good reputation in the area knowing that he was not involved with corruption issues or wasn't seeking authority through the NDP.

Of his prominent attitudes in the Egyptian parliament was

 strong objection of the new parliamentary elections law
 On Feb, 2013, interrogation of the minister of interior and prime minister asking both of them to resign and to be held accountable for the killing and injury of many Egyptian demonstrators in late  January 2012 

 He also attacked the minister of police and the presidential office after the sectarian violence in khousous area and the tragic attack of the Coptic cathedral during the funeral of the killed Christians. he accused the police minister of passively sharing in the attack over the cathedral and showed videos in the parliament to prove his accusation and prove that both the president office and the police minister are liars trying to accuse coptic Christians of initiating violence.
 Elbaiady Called under the parliament for early presidential elections and for the first time during president Morsi, he held a red card and wore a slogan saying " A new president is needed", which made the Muslim brotherhood MPs very angry.
 Dr. Freddy Elbaiady announced in different settings his support to the Tamarod movement.

On 29-6-2013, Dr. Elbaiady resigned from the Parliament publicly during a large press conference for Tamarod movement. He wrote in the written statement to the Parliament Chair that he resigned because of the repeated failure of the parliament and the president to meet the revolution requirements, and that he decided to join the streets revolution on 30-6 calling the president to step down.

Dr. Elbaiady joined the Egyptian Social Democratic Party during his term in the parliament and continued after his resignation as a member of its supreme committee.
The revolution succeeded to oust president 
Morsi and his regime and a transitional government was appointed, Dr. Elbaiady is playing a role through the community and his party calling for a new democratic Civil state.
In 2015,Dr. Elbaiady was elected president of the Egyptian  social Democratic Party in south Kalioubia state, and still serving in this capcity till now.

Egyptian Protestant Church involvement
In 2008, Freddy Elbaiady was Elected member of the Protestant Churches of Egypt Supreme Council. 
He served as president of the Presbyterian churches' junior high youth committee from 2004 to 2012.
He is  a member of the Middle East Council of Churches Peace, Justice and Human rights committee.
He participated and lectured in several local and  international conferences for human rights, Christian Education, and leader training.
 He also lectured in churches and in international conferences in the states and Europe, focusing mainly on the idea of making peace in the community through Medical charity work

Community activity
Elbaiady is the founder and CEO of the Salam Medical Center (SMC), located in El-Qanatir Elkhaireya. Started in 1996, SMC is a registered not-for-profit organization serving about 40,000 patients each year.
Salam Medical Center played a great role in quality health care providence in the local community and became well known in Egypt and in many other countries too as a model of Peace-making through community service 
Salam Medical Service includes a group of qualified medical staff, as volunteers, Muslims and Christians working together, hand in hand

References

External links
 https://www.facebook.com/freddyegypt
 Nile TV interview 21-1-2013
 Freddy Elbaiady at Breakfast show, Nile TV
 http://www.pcusa.org/news/2010/7/29/acting-out-love/
 http://www.mbfoundation.org/news.php?a=page:7
 http://www.smcegypt.org/OrganizationalStructure.htm
 http://shenangopresbytery.wordpress.com/2008/07/
 https://www.youtube.com/watch?v=O8lcVW1o9TA
 https://www.youtube.com/watch?v=D5M9ik1ZBkw
 https://web.archive.org/web/20130118081940/http://egyptelections.carnegieendowment.org/2012/12/28/egypt%E2%80%99s-new-shura-council

Members of the Shura Council
Egyptian Protestants
Living people
1971 births
Egyptian radiologists
People of the Egyptian revolution of 2011
Egyptian human rights activists
Egyptian activists